Rarities – Volume 2 is a digital-only 11-track compilation by English soprano Sarah Brightman. The pop and rock tracks on this volume are extracted from the master tapes of the long sold-out special edition tour CD releases of Fly (1995) and Harem (2003). This compilation contains collaborations with Schiller and Sash! The album was released on December 18, 2015 and was exclusively available for digital download for a limited time.
 
An audio commentary track by Sarah and producer Frank Peterson is included.

Track listing

References 

2015 compilation albums
Sarah Brightman albums